Kairo is a village in the Kairo CD block in the Lohardaga Sadar subdivision of the Lohardaga district in the Indian state of Jharkhand.

Geography

Location                                 
Kairo is located at

Area overview 
The map alongside shows an undulating plateau area with the hilly tract in the west and north-west. Three Bauxite mining centres are marked. It is an overwhelmingly rural district with 87.6% of the population living in the rural areas.

Note: The map alongside presents some of the notable locations in the district. All places marked in the map are linked in the larger full screen map.

Civic administration

Police station 
There is a police station at Kairo.

CD block HQ 
The headquarters of Kairo CD block are located at Kairo village.

Demographics 
According to the 2011 Census of India, Kairo had a total population of 4,553, of which 2,309 (51%) were males and 2,244 (49%) were females. Population in the age range 0–6 years was 731. The total number of literate persons in Kairo was 2,516 (65.83% of the population over 6 years).

(*For language details see Kairo block#Language and religion)

Education
R.P. Memorial Public School is a Hindi-medium coeducational institution established at Utka in 2012 and managed by an unrecognised body. It has facilities for teaching from class VI to class XII.

References 

Villages in Lohardaga district